María Enma Botet Dubois (10 August 1903 – ??) was a Cuban pianist, composer and music educator. She was born in Matanzas and studied music with Hubert de Blanck and Joaquin Nin. After completing her studies, she taught music at the Hubert de Blanck Conservatory and the Amadeo Roldan Conservatory in Havana. She died in Miami.

Works
María Emma Botet composed choral and piano works and pieces for voice and piano, including sones, guarachas, habaneras, rumbas, criollas, guajirs, pregons and boleros. Selected works include:
Suite Cubana for piano
Pequeno Son
Dancitas de Ayer
Era una guajirita
Cancion de guajiro
De dos en dos (contradanza)
Las goticas de lluven bailan el bolero
Bailamos (Habanera)
Caserita se va el dulcero
La cajita de musica toca una criolla
Diablito Carnavalesco

References

1903 births
20th-century classical composers
Cuban music educators
Women classical composers
Cuban composers
Year of death missing
Women music educators
20th-century women composers